3100: Run and Become is a documentary about why people run, with portraits of runners and what motivates them. It was directed by Sanjay Rawal.

Synopsis 
The plot centers on the 3100-mile race in New York City, and also follows Ashprihanal Aalto, a Finnish courier, and Shamita, an Austrian cellist. The film captures the esoteric, spiritual side of running. The film features such diverse locales as New York, to places around the world where ancient cultures have held running sacred, such as the forests of Finland, mountains of Japan, the Kalahari Desert in Africa and the Navajo Nation Reservation in Arizona. It also features the stories of three other runners–Shaun Martin, a Navajo runner and Board Member of Wings of America, Gaolo of the San Bushmen of the Kalahari, and Gyoman-san of the Monks of Mt. Hiei, Japan.

Awards 
 Winner, Director’s Choice – Illuminate Film Festival

Song 
Roberta Flack and the films composer Michael A. Levine contributed the song Running. The song appears on the soundtrack for the documentary.

Reception
Steve Prokopy from the Third Coast Review found the film “intriguing, and an eye-opening look at a way of living most of us will never understand.” After viewing the movie, runners themselves “become more interested in learning more about the role that running plays in different cultures.” Broadway World describes the film as having shone a “light on the universality of the run as an enduring pathway to enlightenment,”while the Santa Fe Reporter appreciated its cultural diversity.

References

External links 
 
 

Sports events founded by Sri Chinmoy
2018 documentary films
2018 films
2010s English-language films
American documentary films
Documentary films about Hinduism
2010s American films